The 1996 FIFA Futsal World Championship was the third FIFA Futsal World Championship, the quadrennial international futsal championship contested by the men's national teams of the member associations of FIFA. It was held between 24 November and 8 December 1996, in Spain.

Brazil won the tournament for the third consecutive time.

Qualifying criteria

Qualified nations

Venues

Draw 
The 16 teams were divided in four groups, each group with four teams.

First round

Group A

Group B

Group C

Group D

Second round

Group E

Group F

Third Round

Semifinals

Third Place

Final

Champions 

12–man Roster
, Marcio, Waginho, Manoel Tobias, Fininho, Sandrinho, Danilo, Choco, Vander, Bage, Clovis, Djacir 
Head coach
Estaquio Afonso Araujo

Tournament ranking

External links 
 FIFA Futsal World Championship Spain 1996, FIFA.com
 FIFA Technical Report (Part 1) and (Part 2)

 
Fifa Futsal World Championship, 1996
FIFA Futsal World Cup
International futsal competitions hosted by Spain
Sports competitions in Barcelona
1996–97 in Spanish football